The enzyme N-acetylgalactosaminoglycan deacetylase (EC 3.1.1.58) catalyzes the reaction

N-acetyl-D-galactosaminoglycan + H2O  D-galactosaminoglycan + acetate

This enzyme belongs to the family of hydrolases, specifically those acting on carboxylic ester bonds.  The systematic name is ''N-acetyl-D-galactosaminoglycan acetylhydrolase. Other names in common use include polysaccharide deacetylase, Vi-polysaccharide deacetylase, and N''-acetyl galactosaminoglycan deacetylase.

References

 

EC 3.1.1
Enzymes of unknown structure